Alan Curnow is a British former racing driver. He raced saloon and touring cars between 1966 and 1991. In 1980 he finished runner-up in the British Saloon Car Championship, winning Class A in a Ford Fiesta. His son Ross is also a racing driver.

Racing record

Complete British Saloon Car Championship results
(key) (Races in bold indicate pole position; races in italics indicate fastest lap.)

† Events with 2 races staged for the different classes.

References

Living people
British Touring Car Championship drivers
1948 births